{{safesubst:#invoke:RfD||2=Microbear|month = February
|day =  5
|year = 2023
|time = 20:11
|timestamp = 20230205201132

|content=
REDIRECT Chipmunk

}}